South Mahoning Township is a township in Indiana County, Pennsylvania, United States. The population was 1,841 at the 2020 census. Historic communities in the township include Ambrose, Denton, Elkin, Frantz, McCormick, Rossmoyne and Wells. The township surrounds Plumville, a separately incorporated borough.

History
The John B. McCormick House was listed on the National Register of Historic Places in 1974.

Geography
According to the United States Census Bureau, the township has a total area of 28.6 square miles (74.0 km2), all  land.

Streams
The Cowanshannock Creek rises in South Mahoning Township.

Demographics

At the 2000 census, there were 1,852 people, 616 households and 481 families residing in the township. The population density was 64.8 per square mile (25.0/km2)  There were 677 housing units at an average density of 23.7/sq mi (9.1/km2). The racial makeup of the township was 99.51% White, 0.05% African American, 0.05% Native American, 0.22% Pacific Islander, 0.05% from other races, and 0.11% from two or more races.

There were 616 households, of which 38.3% had children under the age of 18 living with them, 69.5% were married couples living together, 4.9% had a female householder with no husband present, and 21.9% were non-families. 18.8% of all households were made up of individuals, and 8.3% had someone living alone who was 65 years of age or older. The average household size was 3.01 and the average family size was 3.49.

32.7% of the population were under the age of 18, 7.6% from 18 to 24, 28.0% from 25 to 44, 20.2% from 45 to 64, and 11.6% who were 65 years of age or older. The median age was 33 years. For every 100 females there were 103.7 males. For every 100 females age 18 and over, there were 101.8 males.

The median household income was $32,308 and the median family income was $34,556. Males had a median income of $28,688 and females $20,375. The per capita income was $13,191. About 13.9% of families and 22.5% of the population were below the poverty line, including 37.1% of those under age 18 and 17.7% of those age 65 or over.

References

Townships in Indiana County, Pennsylvania
Townships in Pennsylvania